Keibane Airport  is an airport serving Nara in Mali.

See also
Transport in Mali

References

 OurAirports - Mali
 Great Circle Mapper - Keibane
 Keibane
 Google Earth

External links

Airports in Mali